Hannover-Linden/Fischerhof is a railway station located in Hannover, Germany. The station opened in 1872 and is located on the Hanover–Altenbeken line and the Hanover freight bypass. The train services are operated by Deutsche Bahn as part of the Hanover S-Bahn.

Train services
The following services currently call at the station:

Hannover S-Bahn services  Minden - Haste - Wunstorf - Hannover - Weetzen - Haste
Hannover S-Bahn services  Nienburg - Wunstorf - Hannover - Weetzen - Haste
Hannover S-Bahn services  Hannover Airport - Langenhagen - Hannover - Weetzen - Hameln - Paderborn

Tram services
Hanover Stadtbahn lines 3, 7 and 17 also serve the station.

3: Altwarmbüchen - Stadtfriedhof - Podbielskistraße - Hauptbahnhof - City Centre - Linden/Fischerhof - Wettbergen
7: Schierholzstraße - Podbielskistraße - Hauptbahnhof - City Centre - Linden/Fischerhof - Wettbergen
17: Aegidientorplatz - Hauptbahnhof - Humboldstraße - Linden/Fischerhof - Wallensteinstraße

External links

References

Linden
Hannover S-Bahn stations
Railway stations in Germany opened in 1872